End Play is a 1976 Australian thriller film directed by Tim Burstall and starring George Mallaby, John Waters and Ken Goodlet. It was an adaptation of the 1972 novel End Play by Russell Braddon. It was made by Hexagon Productions.

Plot
Hitchhiker Janine Talbort is picked up and murdered by an unseen assailant. Mark Gifford, a merchant sailor on leave, then disposes of the body, attracting the suspicion of his wheelchair-using brother Robert. The police become suspicious of both brothers, who are rivals over their half-cousin, Margaret.

Cast
 George Mallaby - Robert Gifford 
 John Waters - Mark Gifford 
 Ken Goodlet - Superintendent Cheadle 
 Delvene Delaney - Janine Talbort 
 Charles Tingwell - Doctor Fairburn 
 Belinda Giblin - Margaret Gifford 
 Robert Hewett - Sergeant Robinson 
 Kevin Miles - Charlie Bricknall 
 Walter Pym - Stanley Lipton 
 Sheila Florance - Mavis Lipton 
 Reg Gorman - TV Reporter 
 Adrian Wright - Andrew Gifford 
 Jan Friedl - Policewoman 
 Vicki Raymond - Robbie's Mother 
 Elspeth Ballantyne - Welfare Officer 
 Terry Gill - Ticket Collector

Production
Russell Braddon's novel was originally set in England but was relocated to Australia. Burstall made the film as part of a deliberate effort to move away from "ocker material". He was attracted to Braddon's novel because it would be simple to film as it was basically a two hander, while also preparing Eliza Fraser (1976). The movie was budgeted at $244,000 but eventually cost $294,000. Shooting commenced in January 1975.

The two leads, George Mallaby and John Waters, were familiar faces on Australian television at the time.

Reception
The film performed reasonably at the box-office, and in 1979 reported that it had just broken even. It also rated highly on television, the rights for which earned Hexagon $70,000. Burstall admitted the film might have been more effective as a TV movie, but says it would have been harder to make a profit that way.

The film is rated M in New Zealand for violence and cruelty.

References

Bibliography
 Moran, Albert & Viethm, Errol. Historical Dictionary of Australian and New Zealand Cinema. Scarecrow Press, 2005.

External links

End Play at Oz Movies

1976 films
Australian thriller films
Films directed by Tim Burstall
Films scored by Peter Best (composer)
Films based on Australian novels
Films set in Australia
1970s English-language films
1970s Australian films